Papratnica is a village in the municipalities of Teslić (Republika Srpska) and Žepče, Bosnia and Herzegovina.

Demographics 
According to the 2013 census, its population was 1,192, all of them living in the Žepče part, thus none in the Republika Srpska part.

References

Populated places in Žepče
Populated places in Teslić